Alternaria padwickii is a plant pathogen that attacks rice. It is associated with the disease stackburn, otherwise known as alternaria leaf spot.

Rice grown in northeast Argentina commonly suffers from A. padwickii and the particular strains found there are highly resistant to carboxin and moderately resistant to a few other fungicides.

References

External links 
 Index Fungorum
 
 

Alternaria
Fungal plant pathogens and diseases
Rice diseases